Ville Kähkönen (born 23 June 1984) is a Finnish Nordic combined skier who has been competing since 2002. His lone World Cup victory was in the 4 x 5 km team event in Italy in 2007.

Kähkönen also finished 14th in the 15 km individual Gundersen event at the FIS Nordic World Ski Championships 2007 in Sapporo.

References

1984 births
Finnish male Nordic combined skiers
Living people
Place of birth missing (living people)
21st-century Finnish people